The National University of Singapore Faculty of Law (NUS Law) is Singapore's oldest law school. NUS Law was initially established in 1956 as the Department of Law in the University of Malaya. After its establishment, NUS Law was Singapore's only law school for half a century, until the subsequent establishment of the SMU School of Law in 2007 and the SUSS School of Law in 2017. NUS Law is currently located at the NUS Bukit Timah Campus. The current dean of NUS Law is Andrew Simester. Internationally, NUS Law has been ranked eleventh by the QS World University Rankings by Subject in 2022 and ninth by the Times Higher Education World University Rankings by Subject in 2023.

History 

After its establishment in 1956 as the Department of Law of the University of Malaya, NUS Law attained faculty status in 1959, and Lionel Astor Sheridan was appointed as its founding dean. Its pioneer batch of students graduated in 1961, featuring future notable figures such as Chan Sek Keong and Tommy Koh. After the division of the University of Malaya in 1962, the faculty continued as part of the new University of Singapore. Subsequently, the faculty became part of the National University of Singapore which was formed in 1980 by a merger between the University of Singapore and Nanyang University.

Undergraduate programmes 

The LL.B. programme at NUS Law is a four-year programme. Students take compulsory modules in their first two years and elective modules in their third and fourth years. In terms of exposure to non-law subjects, students may choose to take non-law elective modules offered by other NUS faculties, read for minors outside of law, and take on concurrent or double degree programmes.

Undergraduate students may go on exchange to study in a law school in a foreign jurisdiction. Students on the exchange programme pay only tuition fees at the NUS Law rate. Selected students can also combine completion of their LL.B. at NUS Law with an LL.M. from a partner institution in four years.

The indicative grade profile of the tenth percentile of GCE A-Level applicants offered places in its LL.B. programme in 2020 was AAA/A. Applicants are required to sit for a selection test and attend a formal interview to assess their suitability for the study of law.

Graduate programmes 

For graduate students, NUS Law offers a J.D. programme, several coursework LL.M. programmes, and a research Ph.D. programme. Admissions for graduate programmes generally require a good bachelor's degree in law.

Publications 
NUS Law publishes the Singapore Journal of Legal Studies, one of the oldest law journals in the Commonwealth. It also produces the Asian Journal of International Law (which is published by Cambridge University Press and succeeds the Singapore Year Book of International Law), and the Asian Journal of Comparative Law (also published by Cambridge University Press).

Additionally, the Singapore Law Review, which is Asia's oldest student-run legal publication, is managed exclusively by the students of NUS Law.

Centres 

NUS Law hosts the following centres:

In addition, NUS Law also hosts the Secretariat of the Asian Society of International Law (AsianSIL).

Deans 

The deans of NUS Law from 1956 to present are listed below:

Notable alumni
NUS Law has produced a number of notable alumni, including Senior Counsel, Attorneys-General, Members of the Singapore Parliament, Ministers of the Cabinet of Singapore and Judges of the Supreme Court of Singapore:

Academia
 Tan Cheng Han, SC – former Dean of NUS Faculty of Law
 Thio Su-Mien – former Dean of NUS Faculty of Law

Arts
 Eleanor Wong – playwright

Business
 Tan Min-Liang – Co-founder, CEO and Creative Director of Razer Inc

Judicial
 Sundaresh Menon, SC – Chief Justice and former Attorney-General
 Chan Sek Keong, SC – former Attorney-General, and Chief Justice
 Steven Chong, SC – Judge of Appeal, former Attorney-General, and Managing Partner of Rajah & Tann
 Andrew Ang – former Supreme Court Judge
 Kan Ting Chiu – former Supreme Court Judge
 Lai Siu Chiu – former Supreme Court Judge
 Andrew Phang, SC – former Judge of Appeal
 Judith Prakash – Judge of Appeal
 V. K. Rajah, SC – former Judge of Appeal, and Attorney-General
 Davinder Singh, SC – former CEO of Drew & Napier
 Tan Lee Meng – Supreme Court Judge and former Dean of NUS Faculty of Law
 Ahmad Fairuz Abdul Halim – former Chief Justice of Malaysia

Public service
 Tommy Koh – Ambassador-at-Large for Singapore and former Dean of NUS Faculty of Law
 Ong Keng Yong – Director of the Institute of Policy Studies and former Secretary-General of ASEAN
 Daren Tang – Director General of the World Intellectual Property Organization
 Woo Bih Li, SC – Supreme Court Judge
 Walter Woon, SC – former Attorney-General

Politics
 K. Shanmugam, SC – Minister for Law, and Home Affairs
 Desmond Lee – Minister for National Development
 Edwin Tong, SC – Minister for Culture, Community and Youth and Second Minister for Law
 Indranee Rajah, SC – Minister in the Prime Minister's Office
 S. Jayakumar – former Deputy Prime Minister, and Dean of NUS Faculty of Law
 Halimah Yacob – 8th President of Singapore
 Ho Peng Kee – former Senior Minister of State for Law, and Home Affairs
 Hri Kumar, SC – Deputy Attorney-General and former Member of Parliament for Bishan-Toa Payoh GRC
 Sin Boon Ann – former Member of Parliament for Tampines GRC
 Sylvia Lim – Chair of the Workers' Party
 Karpal Singh – Former Member of the Malaysian Parliament

References

External links 

 NUS Law Website

1956 establishments in Singapore
Law schools in Singapore
National University of Singapore